KB Shkupi is a basketball club based in Skopje, North Macedonia. Established in 1977, the team has won the Macedonian championship.

History

Current roster

Notable players
 Siniša Avramovski

References

External links
 Eurobasket.com KK Shkupi Page

Basketball teams in North Macedonia
Sport in Skopje